Cacería (English language: Man Hunt) is a 2002 Argentine action thriller film directed and written by Ezio Massa and Jorge Bechara. Starring Luis Luque, Claribel Medina, Juan Palomino and Carlos Leyes.

Cast
 Luis Luque ... Daniel
 Claribel Medina ... Elisa
 Juan Palomino ... Lucas
 Matías Sansone ... Nicolas
 Carlos Leyes ... Miguel
 Fernando Díaz ... Coco
 Pochi Ducasse ... Voz Doña Clara
 Horacio Erman ... Padre Guido
 Bernardo Forteza ... Carlos
 Carlos Galettini ... Beltran
 Miguel Gallardo ... Cajide
 Sebastián García ... Gaby
 Miguel Gutiérrez ... Cajide
 Carlos Kaspar ... Gordo
 Gustavo Leyes ... Cabo Leyes
 Puky Maida ... Rodo
 Ezio Massa ... Dealer de armas
 Carmela Moreno ... Mecha
 Fabián Rendo ... Poli
 Carlos Roffé ... Micky
 Maria Roman de Caloni ... Doña Clara
 Golo Sid ... Don Antonio

External links
 
 Cacería at cinenacional.com .

2002 films
2000s Spanish-language films
2002 action thriller films
Argentine action thriller films
2000s Argentine films